Bahija Ahmed Shihab (1932–2012) was an Iraqi sociologist and one of the pioneering women that helped establish the Sociology department at the College of Arts, University of Baghdad, Iraq in the 1950s. Professor Shihab was specialized in Social Work and Community Organization and Development. She has authored several important books, articles, and studies and taught undergraduate and graduate courses at the department and supervised countless Ph.D. dissertations. Professor Shihab persistently promoted social justice causes especially relating to the emancipation of women in Iraq and the Arab world. Prof. Shihab continued to teach at the University of Baghdad until the Summer of 2007 which is when she and her family had to leave Iraq due to the deteriorating general security situation in Baghdad and assassinations targeting Iraqi secularists and academics.
Professor Shihab was a believer in field work and bottom-up understanding of social issues. She held many positions including associate dean and department chair.

Sample Works
 Introduction to Social Work (1982, university textbook, in Arabic) المدخل الى الخدمة الإجتماعية
 Fields of Social Work (1982, in Arabic) ميادين الخدمة الإجتماعية
 Social Work (1990, co-authored with Dr. Ehsan al-Hasan, in Arabic) خدمة الجماعة

References

1932 births
2012 deaths
Iraqi women academics
Iraqi sociologists
Iraqi women sociologists
University of California, Los Angeles alumni
University of Baghdad alumni
Academic staff of the University of Baghdad